Akkur, Haveri  is a village in the southern state of Karnataka, India. It is located in the Haveri taluk of Haveri district in Karnataka.

See also
 Haveri
 Districts of Karnataka

References

External links
 HAVERI DISTRICT

Villages in Haveri district